Frecker is a surname. Notable people with the surname include:
Artie Frecker (1901–1967), Australian rules footballer
George Alain Frecker (1905–1979), Canadian politician and academic administrator, namesake of Institut Frecker in Saint Pierre and Miquelon
Mary Frecker, American mechanical engineer
R. Frecker, Australian Antarctic explorer, namesake of Frecker Ridge in Antarctica
Shannie Duff (née Frecker, born 1936), Canadian politician